The women's 1500m Freestyle event at the 2006 Central American and Caribbean Games occurred on Wednesday, July 19, 2006, at the S.U. Pedro de Heredia Aquatic Complex in Cartagena, Colombia. The event was a timed final event, meaning that it was swum once (rather than the typical 2 times with prelim/finals, and the top-8 advancing).

Records

Results

References

Results: 2006 CACs--Swimming: Women's 1500 Freestyle from the official website of the 2006 Central American and Caribbean Games; retrieved 2009-07-04.

Freestyle, Women's 1500m
2006 in women's swimming